Howard Ellsworth Hoagland (August 15, 1903 – September 4, 1972) was an American film editor. He worked on several films and television series. His career began in 1933, when he edited One Sunday Afternoon.    

In 1936, Hoagland received an Academy Award for Best Film Editing nomination. In 1966, he won a Primetime Emmy Award for editing the television series Bonanza.

Selected filmography
 One Sunday Afternoon (1933)
 The Night of January 16th (1941)
 Cross My Heart (1946)
 The Country Girl (1954)

References

External links

1903 births
1972 deaths
American film editors